Andrew Warner (born June 1, 1967) is a retired American professional wrestler, better known by his ring name "The Black Nature Boy" Scoot Andrews.

After debuting in 1994, Andrew competed for numerous independent promotions throughout his career. Throughout the 1990s he competed in Southeastern independent promotions including Florida Championship Wrestling, Maryland Championship Wrestling, East Coast Wrestling Association, and the National Wrestling Alliance as one half of Naturally Marvellous with Mike Sullivan. He also had a short stint in the World Wrestling Federation during 2001 appearing several times on WWF Jakked and Metal and WWF Sunday Night Heat and again during 2003 and 2004 on WWE Raw and SmackDown. During the early 2000s, he wrestled for Full Impact Pro and Ring of Honor. He continued to compete for independent promotions until his retirement in 2005.

Professional wrestling career
After being trained by Hack Meyers and Damien Lee, Andrews made his professional wrestling debut on September 24, 1994 in a match against Damian Lee. Throughout the 1990s, Andrews competed for a multitude of professional wrestling promotions, including Florida Championship Wrestling,(FCW) Maryland Championship Wrestling,(MCW) East Coast Wrestling Association (ECWA), and the National Wrestling Alliance as one half of Naturally Marvellous with Mike Sullivan.

In early 2000, Andrews competed in the annual ECWA Super 8 Tournament defeating Trent Acid and Chad Collyer before losing to Christopher Daniels in the finals in Newport, Delaware on February 26 (he would again face Daniels at the APW King of the Indies Tournament losing to him in the semi-finals on December 30). He also appeared in Ted DiBiase's short lived WXO promotion that same year, appearing in several televised events, and was voted Florida's Wrestler of the Year. At the end of 2000 and beginning of 2001, he made numerous appearances for the World Wrestling Federation, now World Wrestling Entertainment (WWE), on WWF Jakked, losing to wrestlers including Essa Rios and Crash Holly. Shortly after his appearances on WWF Jakked, he returned to IPW, and on January 13, 2001, Andrews defeated Seijin Akki and Naphtali to win the IPW Light Heavyweight Championship, a title he held until May 19, when he lost it to Akki.  He also won the  promotions Television title before losing it to A.J. Styles on November 24, 2001.

He made further appearance for WWE at the start of 2002, competing on WWE Heat, where he and Michael Shane lost to Tommy Dreamer and Spike Dudley. As well as this, he appeared on Ring of Honor's first ever show, The Era of Honor Begins, on February 23, 2002, losing a singles match against Xavier. He continued competing in independent promotions throughout the rest of 2002, 2003, and 2004, occasionally wrestling in dark matches or on WWE Velocity for WWE. In 2004, he mainly competed for Full Impact Pro and NWA Florida, and on September 4, 2004, Andrews, being managed by SoCal Val, defeated Lex Lovett to win the Florida version of the NWA Southern Heavyweight Championship. He later dropped the Championship back to Lovett on October 9, 2004. At the start of 2005, Andrews was involved in a feud with The Heartbreak Express, consisting of Sean and Phil Davis, taking them on in tag team matches with a number of different opponents. He then moved into a quick feud with Antonio Banks, before announcing his retirement at a NWA Florida show on February 26, 2005.

He was inducted into the ECWA Hall of Fame in December 2005. In 2006, he made an appearance for Elite Wrestling Entertainment, managing D'Lo Brown in a loss to Mike Sullivan.

Championships and accomplishments
Caribbean Championship Wrestling
CCW Heavyweight Championship (1 time)
Championship Wrestling from Florida
NWA Florida Heavyweight Championship (1 time)
NWA Florida Tag Team Championship (1 time) - with Mike Sullivan
NWA Southern Heavyweight Championship (Florida version) (1 time)
Coastal Championship Wrestling
CCW Heavyweight Championship (1 time)
CCW Tag Team Championship (1 time) - with Jason Hexx
East Coast Wrestling Association
ECWA Heavyweight Championship (1 time)
Hall of Fame (2005)
Florida State Professional Wrestling Association
FSPWA Heavyweight Championship (1 time)
FSPWA Tag Team Championship (1 time) - with Hack Meyers
Florida Wrestling Alliance
FWA Heavyweight Championship (1 time)
FWA Light Heavyweight Championship (1 time)
Future of Wrestling
FOW Heavyweight Championship (1 time)
Independent Professional Wrestling
IPW Heavyweight Championship (1 time)
IPW Light Heavyweight Championship (1 time)
Insane Wrestling Alliance
IWA Tag Team Championship (1 time) - with Jason Hexx
Maximum Pro Wrestling
MXPW Television Championship (1 time)
Midwest Championship Wrestling
MCW Heavyweight Championship (1 time)
Pro Wrestling Illustrated
PWI ranked him #114 of the 500 best singles wrestlers of the PWI 500 in 2002
Renegade Championship Wrestling
RCW Heavyweight Championship (1 time)
RCW Television Championship (1 time)
RCW Tag Team Championship (1 time) - with Damian Lee
Southern Championship Wrestling
SCW Mid-Atlantic Heavyweight Championship (1 time)
Southeastern Championship Wrestling
SECW Heavyweight Championship (1 time)
Thunder Wrestling Federation
TWF Television Championship (3 times)

In popular culture
Warner is one of several independent wrestlers referenced in the 2005 novel Backyard Empire: Inspired by a True Story by Alex Hutchinson.

Media
 NWA Florida: Rage in the Cage Perf. Scoot Andrews. DVD. NWA Florida, 2004.
 Takedown Masters Perf. Scoot Andrews. DVD. Ring of Honor, 2004.
 Ring of Honor: The Era of Honor Begins Perf. Scoot Andrews. DVD. Ring of Honor, 2004.
 Best of IPW Hardcore Wrestling, Vol. 1 Perf. Scoot Andrews. DVD. IPW Wrestling, 2006.

Further reading
McNeill, Pat. The Tables All Were Broken: McNeill's Take On The End Of Professional Wrestling As We Know It. Lincoln: iUniverse, 2002.

References

External links
Indy Superstars: Scoot Andrews
Online World of Wrestling: Scoot Andrews
The Accelerator's Wrestling Rollercoaster: Scoot Andrews
Ten Questions With ... Scoot Andrews
PWTimes.com - Scoot Andrews: Biography

American male professional wrestlers
Living people
1971 births
African-American male professional wrestlers
People from Charlotte, North Carolina
People from Wesley Chapel, Florida
21st-century African-American sportspeople
20th-century African-American sportspeople
20th-century professional wrestlers
21st-century professional wrestlers
Sportspeople from Charlotte, North Carolina
NWA Florida Heavyweight Champions
NWA Florida Tag Team Champions